The Am Wall Windmill (Herdentorswallmühle or Mühle am Wall) is an important and iconic building in Bremen, Germany. This 1898 building is open to visitors and it is home to a restaurant.

History
The first windmill on this site was constructed in 1699. The building has been destroyed by fire and rebuilt a number of times, but the current construction was completed in 1898. This design rests on an eight sided base and the upper part is steered by a wind vane. The four sails of the windmill are shuttered. This type of design is known as a smock mill or Galerieholländer.

The windmill is in the middle of a city park that was constructed on the ground where the fortifications of the city once stood. Today the building is heritage listed and inside is a restaurant. Tourists may enter the building after a nominal charge every day, although in the winter it is only open in the afternoon.

In Popular Culture
The mill was featured in the music video for "Take Me Home", by Phil Collins.

References

Windmills in Germany
1698 establishments in the Holy Roman Empire